The 2015 African Fencing Championships were held in Cairo, Egypt from 12 to 16 June.

Medal summary

Men's events

Women's events

Medal table
 Host

References

External links
 Detailed results at En Garde

2015
African Fencing Championships
International fencing competitions hosted by Egypt
2015 in Egyptian sport